Lucas Jade Zumann (born December 12, 2000) is an American actor. He played Milo in the horror film Sinister 2, Jamie Fields in the indie comedy-drama film 20th Century Women and Gilbert Blythe in Anne with an E.

Personal life
Zumann was born in the Chicago, Illinois, neighborhood of Rogers Park, the oldest of three brothers and a sister. He is of Jewish heritage and attended Hebrew school. He attended Waters Elementary School, and then in fifth grade moved to the Chicago Waldorf School until eighth grade, and returned again for twelfth grade.

Career
Zumann made a cameo in the Netflix series Sense8. His first big role was in the horror film Sinister 2, playing Milo. He also played the character Jamie Fields in the Oscar-nominated 20th Century Women, alongside Elle Fanning, Billy Crudup, Greta Gerwig and Annette Bening. He played Gilbert Blythe on the Canadian television series Anne with an E, which premiered in 2017, and portrayed Nathan Daldry/A in the teen rom-com movie Every Day (2018).

Filmography

Film

Television

References

External links 

2000 births
21st-century American male actors
Living people
American male child actors
Jewish American male actors